Maria Shilova may refer to:
 Maria Kechkina (born 1986, née Shilova), Russian orienteer and ski-orienteer
Maria Zhilova (18170-1934), Russian astronomer